Begonia ulmifolia, the elm-leaf begonia, is a species of flowering plant in the family Begoniaceae. It is native to South America; Trinidad and Tobago, Venezuela, the Guianas, and eastern Brazil, and introduced to Mauritius, Réunion, and the Seychelles in the Indian Ocean. Cultivated for its ornamental foliage more than its flowers, it is suitable for green roofs in hot and humid areas.

References

ulmifolia
Flora of Trinidad and Tobago
Flora of northern South America
Flora of Northeast Brazil
Flora of Southeast Brazil
Plants described in 1805
Flora without expected TNC conservation status